Botswana participated at the 2015 Summer Universiade in Gwangju, South Korea.

Medal summary

Medal by sports

Medalists

References
 Country overview: Botswana on the official website

2015 in Botswana sport
Nations at the 2015 Summer Universiade
Botswana at multi-sport events